"Don't You Ever Leave Me" is a song by Finnish glam metal band Hanoi Rocks, released as the third and final single from their 1984 album Two Steps from the Move.

"Don't You Ever Leave Me" made its first appearance on Hanoi Rocks' first album Bangkok Shocks, Saigon Shakes, Hanoi Rocks, but it had more punky atmosphere and faster tempo. They remade the version, which the band loved much more. It is usually considered one of the best songs by Hanoi Rocks. The band's guitarist Andy McCoy commented on the song in Finnish Soundi magazine in 1984: "Well, yeah, we screwed up that song so bad back then, that we had to remake it now. As a song, I think it's fucking great and this version is what the original should have been.".

The version of "Don't You Ever Leave Me" that's on the 12" single differs from the album and 7" single versions, as the 12" single version features the narration's (originally spoken by McCoy and Razzle) spoken by McCoy in Spanish.

The song "Oil And Gasoline" (which was the song's B-side) was a new song that originally made its appearance on the "Underwater World" single the same year in 1984.

"Malibu Nightmare" (which is on the 12" single) was originally featured on the EP for the song "Love's an Injection" in 1982. The song was originally made just as a joke, which had Nasty Suicide on bass, because Sam Yaffa was late from the recording. It was re-recorded on the band's 1983 album Back to Mystery City.

Swedish sleaze rock act Hardcore Superstar covered the song on their second album.

Track listing

Personnel
Michael Monroe - Lead vocals, saxophone
Andy McCoy - Lead guitar, backing vocals
Nasty Suicide - Rhythm guitar, bass on "Malibu Nightmare"
Sam Yaffa - Bass
Razzle - Drums
Gyp Casino - Drums on "Malibu Beach (Calypso version)"
Gregg Brown - Bass on "Oil And Gasoline"

References

1984 songs
1984 singles
Hanoi Rocks songs
Glam metal ballads
Song recordings produced by Bob Ezrin
Songs written by Andy McCoy